Mittelschwaben is a part of the Bavarian administrative region Swabia. It consists of the districts Günzburg, Neu-Ulm, Unterallgäu and the district-free town Memmingen.

The name Mittelschwaben was created in the 19th century to distinguish the Bavarian parts of Oberschwaben from the Baden-Württembergian.

Borders 
in the west (to the Baden-Württembergian Oberschwaben): the river Iller
in the north (to the Donauried): the southern border of the Danube-valley
in the east (to the Stauden, Reischenau and Holzwinkel, the three parts of the Augsburg-Westliche Wälder Nature Park): the rivers Mindel and Flossach
in the south (to the Allgäu): the terminal moraines of the Würm glaciation

 
Swabia (Bavaria)
Neu-Ulm (district)
Günzburg (district)
Unterallgäu

de:Oberschwaben#Mittelschwaben